Vladimir Yakovlevich Vengerov (1920–1997) was a Soviet film director. He directed fourteen films between 1951 and 1985. People's Artist of the RSFSR (1978). His 1962 film A Trip Without a Load was entered into the 3rd Moscow International Film Festival where it won a Silver Prize.

Selected filmography
 The Forest (1953)
 Two Captains (1955)
 The City Turns the Lights On (1958)
 Baltic Skies (1960)
 A Trip Without a Load (1962)
 Rupture (1983)

References

External links

1920 births
1997 deaths
Soviet film directors
People's Artists of the RSFSR
Gerasimov Institute of Cinematography alumni
People from Saratov